Le Coq Musique is a record label based in the UK founded in 1998.

Company history
This English independent record label was established in 1998 by co-founders Kevin Mooney from the band Adam And The Ants and Gary Asquith of Renegade Soundwave. The labels releases have featured Adam Ant, Rammellzee, The Lavender Pill Mob (featuring Mooney, Asquith and Andrew Gray of The Wolfgang Press). Solo artists who appear on Le Coq Musique; Ron Strykert (ex-Men At Work) and Simeone. As of 2011 the label have a new catalogue of releases and have started to issue digital downloads from their back catalogue.

Discography
The Lavender Pill Mob - Mikes Bikes CD & MP3 (2003) Adam Ant, Kevin Mooney, Gary Asquith of Renegade Soundwave & Mass, Rema Rema, The Mekon
The Lavender Pill Mob - CD & MP3 (2004) Kevin Mooney, Gary Asquith of Renegade Soundwave, Rammellzee, Tokyo Monsters, Zoltar The Magnificent
Dragon Bass - 12" EP / CD (2004) Gary Asquith of Renegade Soundwave, Drostan Madden
Tranquil Trucking Company - 12" EP (2003) Gary Asquith of Renegade Soundwave
Ron Strykert - Paradise CD (2009) Ron Strykert Ex - Men At Work
Simeone - The Dream Weaver CD & MP3 (2009) Lee Simeone, Kevin Mooney
Simeone - An Introduction To CD & MP3(2011) Lee Simeone, Kevin Mooney, Gary Asquith of Renegade Soundwave, Karel Fialka, Alan Rear (New Musik / Search Party / Miguel Bosé)

External links
 Official label site
 label discography
 Kevin Mooney discography
 Gary Asquith discography
 Simeone discography

Record labels established in 2003
British record labels
Rock record labels